Awudu Nafiu (born 2 December 1991) is a Ghanaian footballer who plays as a centre-back for Equatorial Guinean club Futuro Kings FC.

References

1988 births
Living people
Ghanaian footballers
Association football central defenders
Ghana Premier League players
Berekum Chelsea F.C. players
Ashanti Gold SC players
Asante Kotoko S.C. players
Futuro Kings FC players
Ghanaian expatriate footballers
Ghanaian expatriate sportspeople in Equatorial Guinea
Expatriate footballers in Equatorial Guinea
Ghana A' international footballers
2011 African Nations Championship players